Ice Age Entertainment is a record label created and owned by southern rapper Mike Jones and business partner Ray "Mello" Moore. The record label was created in 2001. Jones was signed with Swishahouse, in 2004 Swishahouse signed a deal with Asylum Records to manufacture & distribute the label's future releases. The record label is based in two cities, Houston and Atlanta. Mike Jones is atop the list of highest priced music inspired jewelry with his one million dollar “ICE AGE” pendant that pays homage to the label.

Artists 
Mike Jones  - the owner/CEO of the record label, his first album under a major label was Who is Mike Jones?
Thyra - the Vice President/Funkytown Ice Age singer from "Don't Fail Me Now
Nae Nae - Female artist from "Next To You"
Yung Deuce MoneyTrain - Artist from "3 Grams"
Michael Webster - Artist from "The Cook"
Big Tigger - Artist from Swizz Beatz'
D4L - Artist from Down for Life Laffy Taffy (Video) feat. Mike Jones

References

American record labels
Record labels established in 2001
Hip hop record labels